Darya Alexandrovna Kleshcheva (Russian: Дарья Александровна Клещёва; born January 22, 1998) is a Russian rhythmic gymnast.

Career

Senior 
Kleshcheva was included in the Russian group in 2015, she won two gold medals (All-Around and 3 pairs of clubs + 2 hoops) at the 2015 World Championships in the Porsche Arena in Stuttgart. In the same year, she won two gold medals at the 2015 European Games in Baku.

Awards 
 2016: Honored Master of Sports of Russia

References 

1998 births
Living people
Russian rhythmic gymnasts
Medalists at the Rhythmic Gymnastics World Championships